Brian Menell is a South African businessman with interests in mining, agriculture & agri industry and banking. He is the CEO and Chairman of TechMet Ltd. London.

Biography

Menell was born in 1965 in Johannesburg. His grandfather, Slip Menell, was the co-founder in 1932 of the Anglovaal Group, one of South Africa's largest diversified mining and industrial groups of companies. His father was the philanthropist and businessman, Clive Menell, who died in 1996. President Nelson Mandela gave the address at Clive's memorial service in Johannesburg.

Menell went to school at Rugby School in the UK. He holds a BA (Hons) from the University of Pennsylvania in political science and economics.

Career

Mining
Prior to joining Anglovaal Group, Menell worked for the De Beers Group in London, Antwerp and Windhoek for eight years. He originally joined the company as a diamond sorter.

Menell was Principal and executive director of Anglovaal Mining Ltd. which owned precious metal, base metal, ferrous metal and diamond interests across Southern Africa. Menell and his brother Rick retained control of Anglovaal until its sale in 2001 to create the largest South African empowerment controlled company, African Rainbow Minerals. During his time with Anglovaal he was also a 50% partner in the Venetia diamond mine. De Beers' acquisition of Anglovaal's interest in the mine for $600 million was the largest in the company's history.

Since the sale of Anglovaal, Menell has been a participant in different projects and businesses across sub-Saharan Africa.

In 2017 Menell founded and continues to serve as chairman and CEO of TechMet Ltd, an investment vehicle for a portfolio of technology metal projects. TechMet acquires and manages projects that produce, process and recycle the key strategic technology metals that go into batteries, electric vehicles and robotics – cobalt, lithium, nickel, tin, tungsten, rare earth metals, vanadium and graphite.

Menell is the chief executive officer of the Kemet Group which invests in and manages mining and other natural resource projects across the African continent, and advises certain African governments on resource policy and major transactions.  He also serves as Chief Executive of Tinco Investments Limited (an integrated tin and tungsten producer).

Menell is a former Director and Chairman of Shore Gold Inc., one of Canada's largest diamond exploration companies.

Other ventures
In 2004, Menell was a founding partner and executive director of the A1 Grand Prix auto racing series. He is a Director and Chairman of Sallfort Partners AG, a private banking joint venture headquartered in Zurich.

Through the SG Menell Charitable Fund, Menell invests in disadvantaged communities in both South Africa and the rest of the developing world.

Menell has been quoted in Bloomberg and the Financial Times on technology metals, and in the Financial Times as an expert on the diamond industry, African resources, African politics, and resource nationalism. He has spoken at The Times CEO Summit, The Mines and Money Conference, and The New York Africa Forum.

Personal life
He is married with two children.  His wife, Emma Menell is the founding Director of Tyburn Gallery in London, UK.

References

External links
 TechMet Limited website

South African businesspeople
South African motorsport people
A1 Grand Prix people
Auto racing executives
Living people
Year of birth missing (living people)